Schizenterospermum is a genus of flowering plants belonging to the family Rubiaceae.

Its native range is Madagascar.

Species:

Schizenterospermum analamerense 
Schizenterospermum grevei 
Schizenterospermum majungense 
Schizenterospermum rotundifolium

References

Rubiaceae
Rubiaceae genera